Houdini is the fifth studio album by the Melvins, released in 1993 on Atlantic Records. The album was the band's major label debut after releasing their previous albums on the independent label Boner Records.

The album features a cover of the 1974 Kiss song "Goin' Blind". The songs "Hooch", "Lizzy" and "Honey Bucket" were released as singles with accompanying music videos. "Night Goat" is a partial re-recording of a song the band had released as a single in 1992. Nirvana's Kurt Cobain is given co-production credit alongside the Melvins on six tracks, for guitar on the song "Sky Pup" and percussion on the song "Spread Eagle Beagle".

Background and recording
Kurt Cobain was accepted by Melvins as a producer to the album after an A&R at Atlantic Records, who also ran Cobain's management company, suggested him. Despite receiving a co-producer credit, the extent of Cobain's involvement in the album is questionable. Andrew Earles, who included Houdini on his book Gimme Indie Rock: 500 Essential American Underground Rock Albums 1981-1996, stated that Cobain allegedly slept through most of the sessions. Jonathan Burnside, a collaborator of Melvins and engineer on Houdini, remembered: "It's not easy reminiscing about making the album Houdini with Kurt Cobain and the Melvins. Bad communication, drugs, major label profiteering, rehab, schedule blowouts, backstabbing, and album miscrediting... it was a devil's album."  Speaking to Kerrang! in 2008, Melvins guitarist and vocalist Buzz Osborne, who later said in 2009 that Cobain was "in no shape to produce anything", remembered: 

Though the album's liner notes list Lorax as the band's bassist, she does not appear to have played on the album. On the credits for bass, Osborne stated:
"This album is mostly just me and Dale Crover. Either I played bass or he did on almost all of it regardless of what the credits say…"

The album's cover art features an illustration by graphic designer Frank Kozik.

Music and composition
Houdini features a sludge metal, grunge and doom metal sound. Spin critic Jonathan Gold described the record as "not precisely an accessible mainstream album in the 'alternative' mode, not with its random-sounding ten-minute percussion solo, mumbled, cut'n'paste Beef-heartian lyrics, and tempos so slow they make Flipper seem as speedy as Slayer." Earles thought that the album showcases two different versions of Melvins: "a noticeably better variety of the slow, ungodly heavy, yet melodic off-kilter doom-metal with which the band had made its mark in previous years, and speedier fare, like a thick and  weird sludge-thrash driven by catchy, inspired songwriting." AllMusic's Patrick Kennedy regarded the album as a "full fruition" of the outfit's "syrupy distillation of Sabbath riffage and Flipper's noisy anti-punk" that was originally pried open on Eggnog (1991) and Bullhead (1991) releases.

Release and critical reception

Houdini is considered Melvins' commercially biggest release. It has sold 110,000 copies and peaked at number 29 on Billboards Heatseekers Albums chart. The track "Honey Bucket" also received MTV airplay.

AllMusic critic Patrick Kennedy wrote: "With their voluminous output and determination to continuously expand their sound regardless of musical trends, the Melvins oeuvre has begun to rival -- at least on paper -- the career arcs of Frank Zappa and Neil Young." Jonathan Gold of Spin stated: "A few sections are recorded so hot that the guitar distortion literally breaks up into white noise in your speakers; other songs—the hits—are classic Melvins tuneage, which means that they will make you wonder if the batteries are going dead in your boom-box." Chicago Tribunes Greg Kot thought that the album "asserts that a major-label deal hasn't watered them down a bit, though their king-size slam sounds clearer and punchier."

Legacy
Treblezine named Houdini as one of the "10 Essential Sludge Metal Albums" and "The 30 Best Grunge Albums". Diffuser.fm rated it as number 10 on its list of "10 Best Grunge Albums". The track "Hooch" is rated as one of the best songs of the decade by Pitchfork in the book The Pitchfork 500: Our Guide to the Greatest Songs from Punk to the Present.

Mastodon drummer Brann Dailor listed the album as an influence.

In 2005, the album was performed live in its entirety as part of the All Tomorrow's Parties-curated Don't Look Back series. Subsequent performances of the album occurred over the next few years, such as their appearance at the Primavera Sound festival in 2007 and on the band's 25th Anniversary tour in 2009.  A specially recorded live performance of the album was released as A Live History of Gluttony and Lust in 2006.

Largely out of print since the 1990s, the album was reissued in 2016 through Third Man Records.

Track listing
All songs written by the Melvins unless otherwise noted.

Some vinyl copies include a cover of "Rocket Reducer No. 62 (Rama Lama Fa Fa Fa)", originally by MC5, instead of "Spread Eagle Beagle". A Japanese CD release (catalog# AMCY-625) also contains "Rocket Reducer No. 62 (Rama Lama Fa Fa Fa)" as the 14th track at the end of the disc, coming after "Spread Eagle Beagle".

Personnel

Melvins
Buzz Osborne – guitar, vocals, bass producer, mixing, engineer
Lorax – bass (credited but did not perform)
Dale – drums, vocals, bass, producer, mixing, engineer
with
Bill Bartell – bass, lead guitar (4)
Billy Anderson – bass (6, 10); engineer (2–6, 8, 10–12), mixing (3–6, 10, 11)
Kurt Cobain – guitar (8), additional percussion (13); producer (1, 7–9, 12, 13), mixing (1, 7)
Al Smith – additional percussion (13)
Mike Supple – additional percussion (13)

Additional personnel
Jonathan Burnside – engineer (1, 2, 7–9, 12 and 13)
Tom Doty – second engineer (1, 7)
GGGarth Richardson – mixing (3–6, 9, 10, 13), producer (6, 10)
Joe Marquez – second engineer (3–6, 9, 10, 13)
Wolf Kessler – second engineer (6, 9, 10, 13)
Lou Oribin – engineer (8, 12)
Barrett Jones – engineer, mixing (11)
Don Lewis – band photo
Frank Kozik – art direction, illustration
Valerie Wagner – art direction, design
Stephen Marcussen – mastering

Charts

References

External links
 

Melvins albums
1993 albums
Atlantic Records albums
Albums produced by Kurt Cobain
Third Man Records albums